The Italy men's national basketball team represents Italy in international basketball tournaments. They are administered by the Italian Basketball Federation (FIP).

Italy has qualified for 38 EuroBasket tournaments, winning two gold medals (1983, 1999), four silver medals (1937, 1946, 1991, 1997), and four bronze medals (1971, 1975, 1985, 2003) as achievements. While Italy has made nine trips to the World Cup, the closest they have come to winning a medal was in 1970 and 1978, where they finished fourth. In 13 attempts at the Summer Olympics, Italy has earned two silver medals, in 1980 and 2004.

Currently, Italy is ranked 10th in the FIBA World Ranking.

History

The Early Years (1926–39)

The first match of the Italian national basketball team was played on 4 April 1926 in Milan, and it ended with a victory over France 23–17.
Italy's first participation in the Olympic Games was at the 1936 Summer Olympics in Berlin, placing seventh out of twenty-one teams. At the EuroBasket 1937 Italy placed second behind Lithuania, after being beaten by just one point in the final game. The silver medal was repeated at EuroBasket 1946.

The Difficult Postwar Period (1946–69)
Following the end of World War II, the Azzurri went through difficult times and not only failed to qualify for two Summer Olympics and three consecutive world championships but struggled in Europe as well. This was also reflected at the technical level with the alternation of several head coaches within only a few years. Of special importance was Italy's decision not to compete at the EuroBasket 1949, in order to mourn for the victims of the Superga air disaster. It was the first time that the squad missed a EuroBasket.

In 1957, as Nello Paratore took the head coach position (which he held for 11 years) Italy made only slight improvements from the previous decade.

At the 1960 Summer Olympics in Rome, Italy showed its most impressive performance to this point where it placed fourth, only behind USA, USSR and Brazil. Curiously, the organizational expenses of the Olympics in Rome resulted in the decision not to participate in the EuroBasket 1961.

The Decade of Giancarlo Primo (1969–79)
In 1969, Giancarlo Primo became Italy's coach, focusing the game strategies on defense. Under his leadership the Italian national team grew stronger, claiming a place among the world's elite. Under Primo, the Azzuri won two European bronze medals and earned two fourth-place finishes at the FIBA World Cup. Further, Italy finished fourth at the 1972 Summer Olympics where it lost the match for third place to Cuba by only one point. 
Among the leading players of the national team were the young Meneghin, Marzorati, Villalta and Bariviera.

The Successful Years of Gamba (1979–85)

In 1979 Sandro Gamba replaced Primo, leading Italy to its biggest triumphs till then: a silver at the 1980 Summer Olympics in Moscow, a gold at EuroBasket 1983 in Nantes, and a bronze at the EuroBasket 1985 in Stuttgart.
As in the years before, Meneghin, Marzorati and Villalta were the cornerstones of the team, complemented by players such as Riva and Brunamonti. This episode in time stands out to this day as the most successful in the history of the Italian national team.

The National Crisis of 1983: Bianchini and leg-a (1985–92)
Following these outstanding accomplishments was another period of crisis, first under Coach Valerio Bianchini (replaced in 1985), and then another six years of modest success where the biggest accomplishment was silver at the EuroBasket 1991 in Rome, which was called to end Ettore Messina, who took over in 1992. In the same year Enrico Vinci stepped down as President of the Italian Basketball Federation after 16 years. The place was taken over by Giovanni Petrucci.

The Messina-Tanjevic Era (1992–2001)
Ettore Messina became Italy's coach in 1992, winning a silver medal at EuroBasket 1997 in Barcelona. This medal was the main accomplishment of coach Messina, who served the team for five years. Yet, he failed to qualify for the Olympic Games and the World Cup.
A great disappointment was suffered at the 1998 World Cup in Athens, when a team with Fučka, Myers and Meneghin was believed to aspire to the podium but only finished sixth. 
Bogdan Tanjević replaced Messina and led Italy to the triumph at the EuroBasket 1999, the first gold medal in 16 years. The second gold medal at a European Basketball Championship arrived after beating Spain in the final game. After a ninth place at EuroBasket 2001, held in Turkey, Carlo Recalcati was called to replace Tanjević.
Recalcati could count on Italy's top talents Gregor Fučka and Carlton Myers, as well as valuable contributors such as Basile, Abbio and Chiacig.

The Recalcati Era (2001–09)

At the EuroBasket 2003, Italy showed a strong performances and defeated Germany and Greece but was later kicked out by Spain in the semifinals. The victory against France in the bronze medal game guaranteed the team's qualification at the 2004 Summer Olympics in Athens. Italy won a silver medal in that event and was stopped only in the final game by Argentina. Most important, this silver seemed to be worth much more than that of the 1980 Olympics in Moscow where several top teams, including the United States and Canada were absent for a boycott.
Since then, the Azzurri experienced years of only skimpy satisfaction: after the Summer Olympics in Greece, the team collected three ninth-place finishes, two at the EuroBasket and one at the 2006 World Cup. Subsequently, the team failed to qualify for the 2008 Beijing Olympics, the EuroBasket 2009 and the 2010 World Cup.
Despite the increasing internationalization of the NBA (especially towards European players) and a steady presence of Italian players, (including the historic first overall pick Andrea Bargnani of the 2006 NBA Draft) the national team performed poorly in these years. The reasons for this phenomenon are simple: low contribution of NBA athletes, ageing guards (Massimo Bulleri and Gianluca Basile, who were the highlights of Athens already in their thirties) and the lack of young talent. The reason for the seeming lack of talent were caused by the difficulty that Italian talents had in the national championships Serie A. There, they faced strong competition especially from American and European players. It comes as no coincidence that the team that absolutely dominated in the last years, Montepaschi Siena rarely had Italians in the starting lineup.
During these years, the Serie A went through some changes at the top executives level. Fausto Maifredi (in office since 1999) left and the Federation's first commissioner Dino Meneghin changed the rules by mandating for the commissioner to be the league's president as well.
Meanwhile, Italy failed to qualify for the European Championship in 2009, for the first time since 1961. Curiously, 2009 is the first year where the Azzurri failed to qualify for sports-related reasons. Both absences (1949 and 1961) were due to non-sporting reasons. Following the disappointment CT Recalcati left and was replaced by Simone Pianigiani. Pianigiani coached both the national team and Mens Sana Basket, which for years dominated the Serie A.

Coach Pianigiani (2009–2015)

The team with Coach Pianigiani was able to qualify for the EuroBasket 2011 due to an FIBA decision to expand the tournament.

Later, Coach Pianigiani was able to secure Italy a spot at the EuroBasket 2015.

Ettore Messina, the return (2015–2017)
From 5 November 2015, Ettore Messina returned to be head coach of the Italian national team simultaneously with his appointment as assistant-coach of the NBA club San Antonio Spurs.

On 9 July 2016, Italy was defeated by Croatia in the Finals of the FIBA World Olympic Qualifying Tournament in Turin, failing the qualification for the Olympics in Rio de Janeiro.

Prior to EuroBasket 2017, Ettore Messina announced he would leave the bench of Italy's national team after the tournament.

At the EuroBasket 2017, Coach Messina and his players were able to lock up third place in Group B of the preliminary phase and set up a Round of 16 date with Finland. There they reached the Quarterfinals, after a supreme performance from Marco Belinelli to lead the Azzurri. However, Italy would fall against Serbia 83–67, failing to setup an semifinals clash against Russia.

Romeo Sacchetti Era (2017–2022)
Italy named Romeo Sacchetti new head coach of the national team after the Eurobasket 2017. Sacchetti, who was also coach of Vanoli Cremona, began his new job during the 2019 FIBA World Cup qualifiers.

Gianmarco Pozzecco Era (2022–present)
Gianmarco Pozzecco took over in 2022, coaching the team to the EuroBasket 2022, co-hosted by Italy. After a 3–2 record in Group C of the preliminary round, Italy upset favoured Serbia in the round of 16. Despite 29 points from reigning NBA MVP Nikola Jokić and coach Pozzecco being ejected, Italy managed to win the game after overtime. The game was deemed as one of the greatest upsets in EuroBasket history, and coach Pozzecco proclaimed the game to be "probably the best match in the history of Italian basketball". In the quarter-finals, Italy lost after overtime to France.

Competitive record

FIBA World Cup

Olympic Games

EuroBasket

Results and fixtures

2022

2023

Team

Current roster
Roster for the EuroBasket 2022.

Depth chart

Head coach history

Individual records

Players with the most caps (games played) 
Players in bold, are players that are still active.

Players with the most points scored 
Players in bold, are players that are still active.

Highest individual scoring games
 46 Antonello Riva – 29 October 1987 vs. 
 45 Lino Cappelletti – 15 September 1956 vs. 
 41 Antonello Riva – 8 August 1990 vs. 
 40 Claudio Malagoli – 25 May 1978 vs. 
 40 Antonello Riva – 10 August 1984 vs. 
 39 Antonello Riva – 18 July 1986 vs. 
 37 Antonello Riva – 24 June 1992 vs. 
 36 Andrea Bargnani – 2 September 2011 vs. 
 36 Carlton Myers – 3 December 1997 vs. 
 35 Danilo Gallinari – 30 August 2015 vs. 
 35 Antonello Riva – 9 August 1990 vs.

Past rosters
1935 EuroBasket: finished 7th among 10 teams

3 Gino Basso, 4 Bruno Caracoi, 5 Livio Franceschini, 6 Emilio Giassetti, 7 Giancarlo Marinelli, 8 Sergio Paganella, 9 Egidio Premiani, 10 Ezio Varisco (Coach: Attilio De Filippi)

1936 Olympic Games: finished 7th among 21 teams

1 Ambrogio Bessi, 2 Galeazzo Dondi, 3 Livio Franceschini, 4 Emilio Giassetti, 5 Enrico Castelli, 6 Giancarlo Marinelli, 7 Sergio Paganella, 8 Egidio Premiani, 9 Gino Basso, 10 Adolfo Mazzini, 11 Mario Novelli, 12 Michele Pelliccia, 13 Remo Piana (Coach: Decio Scuri)

1937 EuroBasket: finished 2nd  among 8 teams

3 Ambrogio Bessi, 4 Galeazzo Dondi, 5 Livio Franceschini, 6 Emilio Giassetti, 7 Giancarlo Marinelli, 8 Camillo Marinone, 9 Sergio Paganella, 10 Mino Pasquini, 11 Michele Pelliccia, 12 Ezio Varisco (Coach: Guido Graziani)

1939 EuroBasket: finished 6th among 8 teams

3 Giancarlo Marinelli, 4 Mino Pasquini, 5 Mario Novelli, 7 Michele Pelliccia, 8 Gelsomino Girotti, 9 Ambrogio Bessi, 10 Giuseppe Bernini, 11 Aldo Tambone, 12 Bruno Renner, 13 Giovanbattista Pellegrini, 14 Venzo Vannini (Coach: Decio Scuri)

1946 EuroBasket: finished 2nd  among 10 teams

3 Giancarlo Marinelli, 5 Mario Cattarini, 6 Venzo Vannini, 7 Tullio Pitacco, 8 Armando Fagarazzi, 9 Cesare Rubini, 11 Sergio Stefanini, 12 Valentino Pellarini, 13 Albino Bocciai, 14 Marcello de Nardus, 20 Giuseppe Stefanini (Coach: ?)

1947 EuroBasket: finished 9th among 14 teams

3 Cesare Rubini, 4 Marcello de Nardus, 5 Mario Cattarini, 6 Guido Garlato, 7 Giovanni Miliani, 8 Armando Fagarazzi, 10 Sergio Ferriani, 11 Severino Radici, 12 Valentino Pellarini, 13 Giancarlo Primo, 14 Carlo Cerioni, 15 Vittorio Tracuzzi, 16 Massimo Lucentini, 23 Enrico Garbosi (Coach: Elliott van Zandt)

1948 Olympic Games: finished 17th among 23 teams

3 Giancarlo Marinelli, 4 Gianfranco Bersani, 5 Vittorio Tracuzzi, 6 Giancarlo Primo, 7 Romeo Romanutti, 8 Luigi Rapini, 9 Carlo Cerioni, 10 Sergio Ferriani, 11 Federico Marietti, 12 Valentino Pellarini, 13 Giovanni Nesti, 14 Ezio Mantelli, 15 Renzo Ranuzzi, 33 Sergio Stefanini (Coach: Elliott van Zandt)

1951 EuroBasket: finished 5th among 17 teams

3 Giancarlo Primo, 4 Gianfranco Bersani, 5 Vittorio Tracuzzi, 6 Dino Zucchi, 7 Romeo Romanutti, 8 Giorgio Bongiovanni, 9 Cesare Rubini, 10 Giuseppe Sforza, 11 Federico Marietti, 12 Enrico Pagani, 13 Carlo Cerioni, 14 Mario de Carolis, 15 Enzo Ferretti, 33 Sergio Stefanini (Coach: Elliott van Zandt)

1952 Olympic Games: finished 17th among 23 teams

3 Giorgio Bongiovanni, 4 Carlo Cerioni, 5 Renzo Ranuzzi, 6 Sergio Marelli, 7 Luigi Rapini, 8 Fabio Presca, 9 Enrico Pagani, 10 Sergio Ferriani, 11 Federico Marietti, 12 Dino Zucchi, 13 Sergio Stefanini, 15 Giordano Damiani, 16 Achille Canna (Coach: Vittorio Tracuzzi)

1953 EuroBasket: finished 7th among 17 teams

3 Tonino Zorzi, 4 Carlo Cerioni, 5 Giorgio Bongiovanni, 6 Stelio Posar, 7 Alberto Margheritini, 8 Alessandro Riminucci, 9 Cesare Rubini, 10 Achille Canna, 11 Antonio Calebotta, 12 Nicola Porcelli, 13 Giuseppe Lomazzi, 14 Romano Forastieri, 15 Mario Alesini, 16 Rino di Cera (Coach: Vittorio Tracuzzi)

1955 EuroBasket: finished 6th among 18 teams

3 Giordano Damiani, 4 Adelino Cappelletti, 5 Vinicio Nesti, 6 Adelino Costanzo, 7 Alberto Margheritini, 8 Alessandro Gamba, 9 Silvio Lucev, 10 Alessandro Riminucci, 11 Elvio Bizzaro, 13 Germano Gambini, 14 Stelio Posar, 15 Gianfranco Sardagna, 16 Sergio Macoratti (Coach: Jim McGregor)

1957 EuroBasket: finished 10th among 16 teams

4 Gianni Zagatti, 5 Marcello Motto, 6 Cesare Volpato, 7 Stelio Posar, 8 Alessandro Gamba, 10 Paolo Conti, 11 Rolando Rocchi, 12 Vittorio Pomilio, 13 Sergio Macoratti, 14 Antonio Costanzo, 15 Mario Alesini, 16 Giancarlo Sarti (Coach: Carmine "Nello" Paratore)

1959 EuroBasket: finished 10th among 17 teams

3 Paolo Conti, 4 Cesare Volpato, 5 Silvio Lucev, 6 Gabriele Vianello, 7 Gianfranco Pieri, 8 Enrico de Carli, 9 Mario Alesini, 10 Achille Canna, 11 Antonio Calebotta, 12 Giovanni Gavagnin, 13 Gianfranco Lombardi, 14 Claudio Velluti (Coach: Carmine "Nello" Paratore)

1960 Olympic Games: finished 4th among 16 teams

3 Augusto Giomo, 4 Gabriele Vianello, 5 Sandro Riminucci, 6 Gianfranco Lombardi, 7 Gianfranco Pieri, 8 Alessandro Gamba, 9 Mario Alesini, 10 Achille Canna, 11 Antonio Calebotta, 12 Paolo Vittori, 13 Giovanni Gavagnin, 14 Gianfranco Sardagna (Coach: Carmine "Nello" Paratore)

1963 FIBA World Cup: finished 7th among 13 teams

4 Augusto Giomo, 5 Giusto Pellanera, 6 Gianfranco Lombardi, 7 Giambattista Cescutti, 8 Franco Bertini, 9 Paolo Vittori, 10 Sandro Riminucci, 11 Guido Carlo Gatti, 12 Massimo Masini, 13 Giovanni Gavagnin, 14 Gabriele Vianello, 15 Vittorio dal Pozzo (Coach: Carmine "Nello" Paratore)

1963 EuroBasket: finished 12th among 16 teams

4 Ettore Zuccheri, 5 Giusto Pellanera, 6 Valerio Vatteroni, 7 Massimo Masini, 8 Claudio Velluti, 9 Paolo Vittori, 10 Stefano Albanese, 11 Antonio Frigerio, 12 Alfredo Barlucchi, 13 Sauro Bufalini, 14 Santo Rossi, 15 Massimo Cosmelli (Coach: Carmine "Nello" Paratore)

1964 Olympic Games: finished 5th among 16 teams

4 Augusto Giomo, 5 Giusto Pellanera, 6 Gianfranco Lombardi, 7 Gianfranco Pieri, 8 Franco Bertini, 9 Paolo Vittori, 10 Gianfranco Sardagna, 11 Ottorino Flaborea, 12 Massimo Masini, 13 Sauro Bufalini, 14 Gabriele Vianello, 15 Giovanni Gavagnin (Coach: Carmine "Nello" Paratore)

1965 EuroBasket: finished 4th among 16 teams

4 Giambattista Cescutti, 5 Giusto Pellanera, 6 Gianfranco Lombardi, 7 Massimo Cosmelli, 8 Franco Bertini, 9 Tonino Zorzi, 10 Gabriele Vianello, 11 Guido Carlo Gatti, 12 Massimo Masini, 13 Sauro Bufalini, 14 Sandro Spinetti, 15 Ottorino Flaborea (Coach: Carmine "Nello" Paratore)

1967 FIBA World Cup: finished 9th among 13 teams

4 Massimo Villetti, 5 Giusto Pellanera, 6 Gianfranco Lombardi, 7 Carlo Recalcati, 8 Alberto Merlati, 9 Fernando Fattori, 10 Gianluigi Jessi, 11 Gianfranco Fantin, 12 Giuseppe Rundo, 13 Sauro Bufalini, 14 Massimo Cosmelli, 15 Enrico Bovone (Coach: Carmine "Nello" Paratore)

1967 EuroBasket: finished 7th among 16 teams

4 Livio Paschini, 5 Giulio Iellini, 6 Carlo Recalcati, 7 Alberto Merlati, 8 Gianluigi Jessi, 9 Fernando Fattori, 10 Gabriele Vianello, 11 Gianfranco Fantin, 12 Massimo Masini, 13 Sauro Bufalini, 14 Massimo Cosmelli, 15 Ottorino Flaborea (Coach: Carmine "Nello" Paratore)

1968 Olympic Games: finished 8th among 16 teams

4 Carlo Recalcati, 5 Giusto Pellanera, 6 Gianfranco Lombardi, 7 Enrico Bovone, 8 Massimo Masini, 9 Paolo Vittori, 10 Gabriele Vianello, 11 Guido Carlo Gatti, 12 Ottorino Flaborea, 13 Sauro Bufalini, 14 Massimo Cosmelli, 15 Gianluigi Jessi (Coach: Carmine "Nello" Paratore)

1969 EuroBasket: finished 6th among 12 teams

4 Renzo Bariviera, 5 Aldo Ossola, 6 Carlo Recalcati, 7 Enrico Bovone, 8 Massimo Masini, 9 Paolo Bergonzoni, 10 Marino Zanatta, 11 Dino Meneghin, 12 Giuseppe Brumatti, 13 Ivan Bisson, 14 Massimo Cosmelli, 15 Gianluigi Jessi (Coach: Giancarlo Primo)

1970 FIBA World Cup: finished 4th among 13 teams

4 Eligio de Rossi, 5 Ottorino Flaborea, 6 Carlo Recalcati, 7 Ivan Bisson, 8 Massimo Masini, 9 Renzo Bariviera, 10 Marino Zanatta, 11 Dino Meneghin, 12 Augusto Giomo, 13 Antonio Errico, 14 Massimo Cosmelli, 15 Edoardo Rusconi (Coach: Giancarlo Primo)

1971 EuroBasket: finished 3rd  among 12 teams

4 Giorgio Giomo, 5 Ottorino Flaborea, 6 Carlo Recalcati, 7 Giulio Iellini, 8 Massimo Masini, 9 Renzo Bariviera, 10 Marino Zanatta, 11 Dino Meneghin, 12 Pierluigi Marzorati, 13 Luigi Serafini, 14 Massimo Cosmelli, 15 Ivan Bisson (Coach: Giancarlo Primo)

1972 Olympic Games: finished 4th among 16 teams

4 Ottorino Flaborea, 5 Giuseppe Brumatti, 6 Giorgio Giomo, 7 Mauro Cerioni, 8 Massimo Masini, 9 Renzo Bariviera, 10 Marino Zanatta, 11 Dino Meneghin, 12 Pierluigi Marzorati, 13 Luigi Serafini, 14 Ivan Bisson, 15 Giulio Iellini (Coach: Giancarlo Primo)

1973 EuroBasket: finished 5th among 12 teams

4 Fabrizio della Fiori, 5 Giulio Iellini, 6 Gianni Bertolotti, 7 Mauro Cerioni, 8 Vittorio Ferracini, 9 Renzo Bariviera, 10 Marino Zanatta, 11 Dino Meneghin, 12 Pierluigi Marzorati, 13 Luigi Serafini, 14 Ivan Bisson, 15 Giuseppe Brumatti (Coach: Giancarlo Primo)

1975 EuroBasket: finished 3rd  among 12 teams

4 Lorenzo Carraro, 5 Giulio Iellini, 6 Carlo Recalcati, 7 Vittorio Ferracini, 8 Fabrizio della Fiori, 9 Renzo Bariviera, 10 Marino Zanatta, 11 Dino Meneghin, 12 Pierluigi Marzorati, 13 Renato Villalta, 14 Ivan Bisson, 15 Gianni Bertolotti (Coach: Giancarlo Primo)

1976 Olympic Games: finished 5th among 12 teams

4 Giuseppe Brumatti, 5 Giulio Iellini, 6 Carlo Recalcati, 7 Luciano Vendemini, 8 Fabrizio della Fiori, 9 Renzo Bariviera, 10 Marino Zanatta, 11 Dino Meneghin, 12 Pierluigi Marzorati, 13 Luigi Serafini, 14 Ivan Bisson, 15 Gianni Bertolotti (Coach: Giancarlo Primo)

1977 EuroBasket: finished 4th among 12 teams

4 Carlo Caglieris, 5 Giulio Iellini, 6 Lorenzo Carraro, 7 Renzo Vecchiato, 8 Fabrizio della Fiori, 9 Renzo Bariviera, 10 Marco Bonamico, 11 Dino Meneghin, 12 Vittorio Ferracini, 13 Luigi Serafini, 14 Pierluigi Marzorati, 15 Gianni Bertolotti (Coach: Giancarlo Primo)

1978 FIBA World Cup: finished 4th among 14 teams

4 Carlo Caglieris, 5 Giulio Iellini, 6 Lorenzo Carraro, 7 Vittorio Ferracini, 8 Fabrizio della Fiori, 9 Renzo Bariviera, 10 Marco Bonamico, 11 Dino Meneghin, 12 Renato Villalta, 13 Renzo Vecchiato, 14 Pierluigi Marzorati, 15 Gianni Bertolotti (Coach: Giancarlo Primo)

1979 EuroBasket: finished 5th among 12 teams

4 Carlo Caglieris, 5 Renato Villalta, 6 Lorenzo Carraro, 7 Domenico Zampolini, 8 Enrico Gilardi, 9 Roberto Brunamonti, 10 Marco Bonamico, 11 Dino Meneghin, 12 Vittorio Ferracini, 13 Luigi Serafini, 14 Renzo Vecchiato, 15 Gianni Bertolotti (Coach: Giancarlo Primo)

1980 Olympic Games: finished 2nd  among 12 teams

4 Meo Sacchetti, 5 Roberto Brunamonti, 6 Mike Sylvester, 7 Enrico Gilardi, 8 Fabrizio della Fiori, 9 Marco Solfrini, 10 Marco Bonamico, 11 Dino Meneghin, 12 Renato Villalta, 13 Renzo Vecchiato, 14 Pierluigi Marzorati, 15 Pietro Generali (Coach: Sandro Gamba)

1981 EuroBasket: finished 5th among 12 teams

4 Roberto Brunamonti, 6 Mike Sylvester, 7 Enrico Gilardi, 8 Ario Costa, 9 Vittorio Ferracini, 10 Renato Villalta, 11 Dino Meneghin, 12 Domenico Zampolini, 13 Renzo Vecchiato, 14 Pierluigi Marzorati, 15 Pietro Generali, 16 Franco Boselli (Coach: Sandro Gamba)

1983 EuroBasket: finished 1st  among 12 teams

4 Carlo Caglieris, 5 Alberto Tonut, 6 Marco Bonamico, 7 Enrico Gilardi, 8 Ario Costa, 9 Roberto Brunamonti, 10 Renato Villalta, 11 Dino Meneghin, 12 Antonello Riva, 13 Renzo Vecchiato, 14 Pierluigi Marzorati, 15 Romeo Sacchetti (Coach: Sandro Gamba)

1984 Olympic Games: finished 5th among 12 teams

4 Carlo Caglieris, 5 Roberto Premier, 6 Marco Bonamico, 7 Enrico Gilardi, 8 Walter Magnifico, 9 Roberto Brunamonti, 10 Renato Villalta, 11 Dino Meneghin, 12 Antonello Riva, 13 Renzo Vecchiato, 14 Pierluigi Marzorati, 15 Meo Sacchetti (Coach: Sandro Gamba)

1985 EuroBasket: finished 3rd  among 12 teams

4 Giampiero Savio, 5 Beppe Bosa, 6 Ario Costa, 7 Enrico Gilardi, 8 Walter Magnifico, 9 Roberto Brunamonti, 10 Renato Villalta, 11 Augusto Binelli, 12 Roberto Premier, 13 Renzo Vecchiato, 14 Pierluigi Marzorati, 15 Meo Sacchetti (Coach: Sandro Gamba)

1986 FIBA World Cup: finished 6th among 24 teams

4 Roberto Premier, 5 Ario Costa, 6 Walter Magnifico, 7 Enrico Gilardi, 8 Fulvio Polesello, 9 Roberto Brunamonti, 10 Renato Villalta, 11 Augusto Binelli, 12 Antonello Riva, 13 Sandro Dell'Agnello, 14 Pierluigi Marzorati, 15 Meo Sacchetti (Coach: Valerio Bianchini)

1987 EuroBasket: finished 5th among 12 teams

4 Piero Montecchi, 5 Ferdinando Gentile, 6 Walter Magnifico, 7 Alberto Tonut, 8 Massimo Iacopini, 9 Roberto Brunamonti, 10 Renato Villalta, 11 Angelo Gilardi, 12 Antonello Riva, 13 Riccardo Morandotti, 14 Ario Costa, 15 Flavio Carera (Coach: Valerio Bianchini)

1989 EuroBasket: finished 4th among 8 teams

4 Andrea Gracis, 5 Mike D'Antoni, 6 Walter Magnifico, 7 Sandro Dell'Agnello, 8 Beppe Bosa, 9 Roberto Brunamonti, 10 Massimo Iacopini, 11 Augusto Binelli, 12 Antonello Riva, 13 Riccardo Morandotti, 14 Ario Costa, 15 Flavio Carera (Coach: Sandro Gamba)

1990 FIBA World Cup: finished 9th among 16 teams

4 Alberto Rossini, 5 Riccardo Pittis, 6 Andrea Niccolai, 7 Sandro Dell'Agnello, 8 Giuseppe Bosa, 9 Roberto Brunamonti, 10 Gustavo Tolotti, 11 Francesco Vescovi, 12 Antonello Riva, 13 Davide Pessina, 14 Alberto Vianini, 15 Davide Cantarello (Coach: Sandro Gamba)

1991 EuroBasket: finished 2nd  among 8 teams

4 Alessandro Fantozzi, 5 Ferdinando Gentile, 6 Walter Magnifico, 7 Sandro Dell'Agnello, 8 Andrea Gracis, 9 Roberto Brunamonti, 10 Roberto Premier, 11 Riccardo Pittis, 12 Antonello Riva, 13 Davide Pessina, 14 Ario Costa, 15 Stefano Rusconi (Coach: Sandro Gamba)

1993 EuroBasket: finished 9th among 16 teams

4 Claudio Coldebella, 5 Ferdinando Gentile, 6 Massimo Iacopini, 7 Alberto Tonut, 8 Beppe Bosa, 9 Riccardo Pittis, 10 Carlton Myers, 11 Paolo Moretti, 12 Alberto Rossini, 13 Alessandro Frosini, 14 Flavio Carera, 15 Stefano Rusconi (Coach: Ettore Messina)

1995 EuroBasket: finished 5th among 14 teams

4 Claudio Coldebella, 5 Ferdinando Gentile, 6 Walter Magnifico, 7 Riccardo Pittis, 8 Vincenzo Esposito, 9 Paolo Conti, 10 Alessandro Abbio, 11 Gregor Fučka, 12 Federico Pieri, 13 Alessandro Frosini, 14 Flavio Carera, 15 Stefano Rusconi (Coach: Ettore Messina)

1997 EuroBasket: finished 2nd  among 16 teams

4 Claudio Coldebella, 5 Davide Bonora, 6 Gregor Fučka, 7 Riccardo Pittis, 8 Denis Marconato, 9 Giacomo Galanda, 10 Carlton Myers, 11 Paolo Moretti, 12 Alessandro Abbio, 13 Alessandro Frosini, 14 Flavio Carera, 15 Dan Gay (Coach: Ettore Messina)

1998 FIBA World Cup: finished 6th among 16 teams

4 Davide Bonora, 5 Gianluca Basile, 6 Alessandro De Pol, 7 Gregor Fučka, 8 Gianmarco Pozzecco, 9 Giacomo Galanda, 10 Carlton Myers, 11 Andrea Meneghin, 12 Alessandro Abbio, 13 Alessandro Frosini, 14 Roberto Chiacig, 15 Marcelo Damiao (Coach: Bogdan Tanjević)

1999 EuroBasket: finished 1st  among 16 teams

4 Davide Bonora, 5 Gianluca Basile, 6 Giacomo Galanda, 7 Gregor Fučka (MVP), 8 Denis Marconato, 9 Alessandro De Pol, 10 Carlton Myers, 11 Andrea Meneghin, 12 Alessandro Abbio, 13 Michele Mian, 14 Roberto Chiacig, 15 Marcelo Damiao (Coach: Bogdan Tanjević)

2000 Olympic Games: finished 5th among 12 teams

4 Germán Scarone, 5 Gianluca Basile, 6 Giacomo Galanda, 7 Gregor Fučka, 8 Denis Marconato, 9 Agostino Li Vecchi, 10 Carlton Myers, 11 Andrea Meneghin, 12 Alessandro Abbio, 13 Michele Mian, 14 Roberto Chiacig, 15 Marcelo Damiao (Coach: Bogdan Tanjević)

2001 EuroBasket: finished 9th among 16 teams

4 Nikola Radulović, 5 Gianluca Basile, 6 Giacomo Galanda, 7 Gregor Fučka, 8 Denis Marconato, 9 Alessandro De Pol, 10 Andrea Pecile, 11 Andrea Meneghin, 12 Alex Righetti, 13 Michele Mian, 14 Roberto Chiacig, 15 Andrea Camata (Coach: Bogdan Tanjević)

2003 EuroBasket: finished 3rd  among 16 teams

4 Nikola Radulović, 5 Gianluca Basile, 6 Giacomo Galanda, 7 Matteo Soragna, 8 Denis Marconato, 9 Alessandro De Pol, 10 Alex Righetti, 11 Davide Lamma, 12 Massimo Bulleri, 13 Michele Mian, 14 Roberto Chiacig, 15 Alessandro Cittadini (Coach: Carlo Recalcati)

2004 Olympic Games: finished 2nd  among 12 teams

4 Nikola Radulović, 5 Gianluca Basile, 6 Giacomo Galanda (C), 7 Matteo Soragna, 8 Denis Marconato, 9 Gianmarco Pozzecco, 10 Alex Righetti, 11 Rodolfo Rombaldoni, 12 Massimo Bulleri, 13 Michele Mian, 14 Roberto Chiacig, 15 Luca Garri (Coach: Carlo Recalcati)

2005 EuroBasket: finished 10th among 16 teams

4 Dante Calabria, 5 Gianluca Basile, 6 Giacomo Galanda, 7 Matteo Soragna, 8 Denis Marconato, 9 Gianmarco Pozzecco, 10 Alex Righetti, 11 Stefano Mancinelli, 12 Massimo Bulleri, 13 Marco Mordente, 14 Roberto Chiacig, 15 Angelo Gigli (Coach: Carlo Recalcati)

2006 FIBA World Cup: finished 9th among 24 teams

4 Fabio Di Bella, 5 Gianluca Basile, 6 Stefano Mancinelli, 7 Matteo Soragna, 8 Denis Marconato, 9 Marco Belinelli, 10 Andrea Pecile, 11 Andrea Michelori, 12 Mason Rocca, 13 Marco Mordente, 14 Luca Garri, 15 Angelo Gigli (Coach: Carlo Recalcati)

2007 EuroBasket: finished 9th among 16 teams

4 Marco Belinelli, 5 Gianluca Basile, 6 Stefano Mancinelli, 7 Matteo Soragna, 8 Denis Marconato, 9 Marco Mordente, 10 Andrea Bargnani, 11 Andrea Crosariol, 12 Massimo Bulleri, 13 Fabio Di Bella, 14 Luigi Datome, 15 Angelo Gigli (Coach: Carlo Recalcati)

2011 EuroBasket: finished 20th among 24 teams

4 Antonio Maestranzi, 5 Marco Carraretto, 6 Stefano Mancinelli, 7 Andrea Bargnani, 8 Danilo Gallinari, 9 Marco Mordente (C), 10 Andrea Cinciarini, 11 Marco Belinelli, 12 Marco Cusin, 13 Luigi Datome, 14 Andrea Renzi, 15 Daniel Hackett (Coach: Simone Pianigiani)

2013 EuroBasket: finished 8th among 24 teams

4 Pietro Aradori, 5 Alessandro Gentile, 6 Guido Rosselli, 7 Luca Vitali, 8 Giuseppe Poeta, 9 Nicolò Melli, 10 Marco Belinelli, 11 Travis Diener, 12 Marco Cusin, 13 Luigi Datome, 14 Daniele Magro, 15 Andrea Cinciarini (Coach: Simone Pianigiani)

2015 EuroBasket: finished 6th among 24 teams

00 Amedeo Della Valle, 3 Marco Belinelli, 4 Pietro Aradori, 5 Alessandro Gentile, 8 Danilo Gallinari, 9 Andrea Bargnani, 12 Marco Cusin, 13 Luigi Datome (C), 17 Nicolò Melli, 20 Andrea Cinciarini, 23 Daniel Hackett, 33 Achille Polonara (Coach: Simone Pianigiani)

2017 EuroBasket: finished 7th among 24 teams

0 Daniel Hackett, 3 Marco Belinelli, 4 Pietro Aradori, 5 Ariel Filloy, 6 Paul Biligha, 9 Nicolò Melli, 12 Marco Cusin, 20 Andrea Cinciarini, 23 Awudu Abass, 24 Filippo Baldi Rossi, 32 Christian Burns, 70 Luigi Datome (C) (Coach: Ettore Messina)

2019 FIBA World Cup: finished 10th among 32 teams

00 Amedeo Della Valle, 3 Marco Belinelli, 5 Alessandro Gentile, 6 Paul Biligha, 7 Luca Vitali, 8 Danilo Gallinari, 10 Daniel Hackett, 12 Ariel Filloy, 15 Jeff Brooks, 16 Amedeo Tessitori, 23 Awudu Abass, 70 Luigi Datome (C) (Coach: Romeo Sacchetti)

2020 Olympic Games: finished 5th among 12 teams

0 Marco Spissu, 1 Nico Mannion, 7 Stefano Tonut, 8 Danilo Gallinari, 9 Nicolò Melli (C), 13 Simone Fontecchio, 16 Amedeo Tessitori, 17 Giampaolo Ricci, 24 Riccardo Moraschini, 31 Michele Vitali, 33 Achille Polonara, 54 Alessandro Pajola (Coach: Romeo Sacchetti)

2022 EuroBasket: finished 8th among 24 teams

0 Marco Spissu, 3 Nico Mannion, 6 Paul Biligha, 7 Stefano Tonut, 9 Nicolò Melli, 13 Simone Fontecchio, 16 Amedeo Tessitori, 17 Giampaolo Ricci, 25 Tommaso Baldasso, 33 Achille Polonara, 54 Alessandro Pajola, 70 Luigi Datome (C) (Coach: Gianmarco Pozzecco)

Kit

Manufacturer
2017–present: Spalding

Sponsor
2015–2021: Barilla
2022–present: ITA Airways

See also

Sport in Italy
Italy women's national basketball team
Italy men's national under-20 basketball team
Italy men's national under-19 basketball team
Italy men's national under-17 basketball team
Italy men's national 3x3 team

References and notes

External links

 
Italy FIBA profile 
Italy National Team – Men at Eurobasket.com
Italy Basketball Records at FIBA Archive

Videos
Serbia v Italy – Highlights – EuroBasket 2022 (Round of 16) Youtube.com video

 
M
Men's national basketball teams
FIBA EuroBasket-winning countries
1932 establishments in Italy